Mircea Crișan (8 August 1924 – 22 November 2013) was considered to be one of the greatest Romanian comedians and comedic actors.

Biography
He was born in the Maramureș region of northern Romania to a German father and Romanian mother. He traveled as a child with his parents in their circus. From 1944 to 1946 he studied Dramatic Art at the State Drama School in Bucharest, in the class of Maria Filotti. In the 1950s and 1960s, Crișan played in several Romanian comedies and the theater. He was known as a star of the former Eastern Bloc and even performed privately for Nikita Khrushchev. In 1964 he was awarded the title of "Artist Emerit" of the Romanian People's Republic.

He took advantage of his second stint in the Music Hall Olympia in Paris in order to settle in 1968 in West Germany.  He acted between 1974 and 1987 in four episodes of the television series Tatort. His film roles included Werner – Beinhart!, Schtonk!, and the 2005 Oscar nominated As It Is in Heaven.

Crișan acted between 1993 and 1997 and from 1999 until 2006 in the Störtebeker Festival. In 2006, he joined the Pumuckl theater tour. In 2007 he received in Sibiu the Culture Prize of the Romanian Theatre Union (UNITER). He spoke German, Romanian, Russian, Hebrew, English, Bulgarian, Italian, and Czech and lived in Hesse Maintal.

He died in November 2013 in Düsseldorf.

Selected filmography
 1955: Și Ilie face sport
 1965: Mofturi 1900
 1966: 
 1967:  – Costică
 1970: Rudi Carrell Show
 1974: Am laufenden Band
 1974: Tatort – 
 1975: Zwischenmahlzeit
 1976: Derrick
 1976: Tatort – Annoncen-Mord
 1978:  (TV series, 1 episode)
 1986: Tatort – 
 1987: Tatort – 
 1990: Werner – Beinhart!
 1992: Schtonk!
 1993: Die Männer vom K3
 1998: Die Wache
 2001: Polizeiruf 110 – Seestück mit Mädchen
 2002: Großstadtrevier
 2004: As It Is in Heaven

References

External links

1924 births
2013 deaths
People from Maramureș County
Romanian comedians
Romanian emigrants to Germany
German people of German-Romanian descent
German male film actors
German male television actors
Romanian male film actors
Romanian male stage actors